The 2018 European Rally Championship was the 66th season of the FIA European Rally Championship, the European continental championship series in rallying. The season was also the sixth following the merge between the European Rally Championship and the Intercontinental Rally Challenge. Kajetan Kajetanowicz was the reigning champion but he didn't return to defend his title.

For the second season, the European Junior Championship was split into two new categories. ERC Junior U27, which totals six events, is for drivers born on or after 1 January 1991 competing in R2 cars on Pirelli tyres. With the best four rounds counting, the winner will receive a career progression fund worth 100,000 euros to use in ERC Junior U28 in 2019.

ERC Junior U28 offers the next step on the rallying pyramid for drivers born on or after 1 January 1990. Again totalling six rounds with the best four scores counting, drivers use R5 cars with no restriction on tyre choice. The champion will get a drive on a European round of the 2019 FIA World Rally Championship as a P1 driver in a 2016-specification World Rally Car.

Calendar

The calendar for the 2018 season features eight rallies like the previous season. Rajd Rzeszowski was replaced by Rally Poland.

Teams and drivers

ERC

ERC-2

ERC-3

Ladies Trophy

Results

Championship standings

Points Systems

ERC, ERC-2, ERC-3, ERC Junior U28, ERC Junior U27, Teams and Ladies Trophy
 For the Teams' championship all the results will be retained by each team.
 For both the Drivers' championships of the ERC, ERC-2 and ERC-3, only the best six results will be retained by each driver.
 For the ERC Junior U28, the ERC Junior U27 and the Ladies Trophy, only the best four results will be retained by each driver.
 Points for final position are awarded as in following table:

 Bonus points awarded for position in each Leg

Drivers' Championships

ERC

ERC-2

ERC-3

Ladies Trophy

ERC Junior U28

ERC Junior U27

Teams' Championship

Nations Cup

References

External links
 

 
2018 in rallying
Rally
2018